The following is a list of Heroes of the Soviet Union who were born or lived in the Moldavian SSR or were of who were of Moldovan ethnicity.

List

References

External links 

 Нашии соотечественники — Герои Советского Союза
 Кто из уроженцев Молдавии был награждён званием Героя Советского Союза
 ПРИДНЕСТРОВЦЫ — ГЕРОИ СОВЕТСКОГО СОЮЗА

Heroes of the Soviet Union lists
Lists of Moldovan people
Communism in Moldova